Zarema Gaisanova (circa 1969 — enforced disappearance, October 31, 2009) — is a human rights activist, a native Chechen. On October 31, 2009, Zarema Gaisanova was kidnapped in Chechen Capital of Grozny by group of armed men during a special operation headed by president of  Chechen Republic, Ramzan Kadyrov. Zarema Gaisanova was a worker for Danish Refugee Council in Chechen Republic, and, according to Zarema Gaisanova's colleagues, she was abducted and probably murdered.

European Court of Human Rights ruling
On May 12, 2016, the European Court of Human Rights (ECHR) has issued a ruling to compensate €60,000 for Zarema Gaisanova's mother, Lida Gaisanova. ECHR decided that Russia violated several articles of the European Convention on Human Rights, and state officials are responsible for the abduction and probable death. ECHR found: Article 2 (right to life), Article 3 (prohibition of torture and inhuman or degrading treatment), Article 5 (right to liberty and security) of the European Convention on Human Rights had been violated.

See also
List of kidnappings
List of people who disappeared

References 

1960s births
2010s missing person cases
Chechen human rights activists
Kidnapped people
Missing people
Missing person cases in Russia
Women human rights activists
Women in the Chechen wars